The 1909 Monterrey hurricane was one of the deadliest Atlantic tropical cyclones on record, killing an estimated 4,000 people throughout Mexico. Originating from a tropical storm east of the Leeward Islands on August 20, the storm tracked west-northwest, entering the Caribbean as a minimal hurricane the next day. After striking Hispaniola on August 23, the hurricane made another landfall in eastern Cuba before reentering the Caribbean. Once back over open water, the storm intensified into a Category 3 hurricane and moved across the northern tip of the Yucatán Peninsula. By August 26, the storm had emerged into the Gulf of Mexico as a weakened, but regrouping system. It attained its peak winds of  that evening. Maintaining this intensity, the system made landfall in the Mexican state of Tamaulipas late on August 27 and rapidly dissipated the following afternoon.

Throughout its existence, the hurricane remained relatively close to land, so consequently its effects were felt in many areas. Much of the northern Caribbean received moderate to heavy rainfall along with gusty winds during its passage; although only Haiti reported damage from it. Its effects were far more severe in Mexico where an estimated 4,000 people were killed by record-breaking floods triggered by the hurricane. The city of Monterrey received the worst damage: more than half of the structures in the city were flooded, hundreds were destroyed, and 20,000 people were left homeless. Damage from the storm in the country was estimated to have exceeded $50 million (1909 USD; $  USD).

Meteorological history

The origins of the hurricane are uncertain due to a lack of ship reports in the western Atlantic Ocean. According to the Atlantic hurricane database, it was first identifiable as a tropical storm on August 20 to the east of the Leeward Islands. By the evening of August 21, the storm entered the Caribbean as it brushed the northern coast of Guadeloupe; intensification of the hurricane over the northeastern Caribbean was slow.

The hurricane weakened slightly over the mountainous terrain of Hispaniola, although it is believed to have maintained winds of at least  based on damage reports in Haiti. Later on August 23, the storm "jumped" northward before making another landfall in the Cuban province of Guantánamo. Continuing towards the west-northwest, the hurricane regained strength as it moved over the northern Caribbean. It soon slowed and turned due west, maintaining its intensity. Late on August 27, the storm made its final landfall in the Mexican state of Tamaulipas. Rapid weakening took place as it drifted onshore, and it dissipated the following afternoon.

Impact

Caribbean
Prior to the hurricane's devastating impacts in Mexico, it brought heavy rains and high winds to several of the northern Caribbean Islands. The first to be affected by the storm were the Leeward Islands; however, no known damage resulted from its passage. Moderate rain and gusty winds were reported in Puerto Rico as well as the Dominican Republic and Jamaica. In eastern Jamaica, between Aquavale and Hope, the banana crop was largely destroyed. Haiti suffered severe damage was reported in many towns, with homes destroyed and many homeless. Much of Cuba was also impacted by the storm, with winds up to  being recorded as far north as Havana.

Mexico
Although a borderline Category 2–3 hurricane when it made landfall in the Yucatán Peninsula, little is known about the storm's impact in the region. Aside from seasickness, none of the vessel's 24 crewmen were injured. However, following the hurricane's second landfall, the resulting damage was catastrophic. During the overnight hours between August 27 and 28, cities along the coastline of Tamaulipas likely sustained severe damage from the hurricane's storm surge and high winds.

The worst of the damage took place further inland, within the state of Nuevo León. There, torrential rainfall triggered a flood even exceeding 100-year flood values. According to meteorologists in Mexico, the storm dropped  of rain over a 40‑hour span. Further rains fell for the following 32 hours, worsening the situation. Adobe homes that survived the initial onslaught collapsed in these rains, killing many people. The rising Santa Catarina River flowed into the San Juan River, causing an abrupt rise and subsequent overflow of water that caught residents off-guard. Multiple small communities were swept away in the ensuing floods. According to Mexican officials, overnight on August 27, the reservoir dam near Nuevo León's capital city, Monterrey, burst, flooding more than half of the buildings in the city, as well as all of the nearby town of San Luisto. Steel works and smelters situated along the Santa Catarina River were destroyed after the river rose well over its banks. Hundreds of homes were destroyed throughout the city, leaving an estimated 20,000 people homeless. According to the American Society of Civil Engineers, an enormous 235,000 ft3 (6,650 m3) of water was being moved per second during the height of the flood. The raging rivers finally subsided by August 30.

The force of the current led to most homes being taken off their foundations and sent downstream, resulting in the deaths of anyone inside. In one incident, 90 people died after seeking refuge in a school after their homes collapsed. However, not long after entering the building, flood waters inundated the structure and caused it to collapse. By the morning, survivors reported that the state of the city was "indescribable". The San Francisco church, built in 1572, was destroyed during the storm. Damage from the hurricane was estimated to have been at least $50 million (1909 USD; $  USD). Of this, roughly $20 million was attributed to railroad losses. Throughout Mexico, reports indicated that about 4,000 people were killed as a result of the storm, making it one of the deadliest Atlantic hurricanes on record. Some estimates place the death toll as high as 5,000 and others as low as 3,000. Of these fatalities, 800 are believed to have been in the south side of Monterrey where four blocks of the city were completely destroyed.

United States
While the hurricane traversed Cuba on August 24, the United States National Weather Bureau issued hurricane warnings for southern Florida between Tampa and Jupiter and advised ships to avoid the eastern Gulf and South Atlantic. Ahead of the hurricane's landfall in Mexico, the Weather Bureau raised storm and hurricane warnings for the Texas coat on August 27. Tides were described as the highest in several years. Tarpon Beach was devastated by surging waters, with every structure except the lighthouse and quarantine station being damaged or destroyed. Rescued personnel from Brazos Santiago were able to save all of the stranded residents as waters rose. The coastlines of Mustang Island and San José Island straddling Aransas Pass were submerged. A tornado near Beeville destroyed a large barn and outhouse. Rainfall from the hurricane reached  in Falfurrias between August 27 and 28. Twenty-four-hour rainfall reached  in La Parra, a state record for the month of August at the time. Overall damage in the state was minimal from the storm and there were no deaths.

Aftermath
Crippled communication networks and infrastructure hampered relief efforts in the immediate aftermath. The city of Monterrey was entirely cut-off and within days, food supplies were low and residents were at risk of famine. Local water supplies were rendered useless. Many residents and visitors in the city did all they could to help rescue those trapped in the flood waters and take care of the homeless. According to The New York Times, one person rescued 30 people stranded in flood waters. Numerous rescue operations were undertaken during the flood, saving many lives. However, survivors faced another issue after losing their homes: lack of food. Food was unavailable to most residents in the wake of the storm until August 31 when the first relief supplies arrived. Even then, most only received a small amount of bread and beans. Municipal authorities and the American Consulate provided bread, coffee, and soup to more than 10,000 people. Benefit performances and bull fights were planned to raise charity money. American Consulate General Hanna appealed for American aid on August 30 and the American Red Cross appealed for $20,000.

Once the flood along the Santa Catarina River receded, searches were conducted to attempt to locate the bodies of victims. However, reports indicated that the river bed was similar to quicksand and most bodies on it were likely underground. To deal with the large number of bodies in the wake of the disaster, Mexican officials decided to cremate and mass bury victims. By mid-September, between 1,600 and 1,800 people were hired to repair and rebuild the devastated railways in Nuevo León. In 2009, the third edition of the book El Río Fiera Bramaba: 1909 by Oswaldo Sánchez, re-accounting reports form people who experienced the flood, was planned. According to the director of publications at the Universidad Autónoma de Nuevo León, the book was considered one of historical quality. In memory of those who perished during the flood, the book was released to the public on August 27, 2009, the 100 year anniversary of the disaster.

See also

1909 Atlantic hurricane season
List of tropical cyclone records
List of tropical cyclones
List of deadliest Atlantic hurricanes
Hurricane Alex (2010) - Caused similarly disastrous flooding in Monterrey
Hurricane Charlie (1951)
Hurricane Gilbert

References
General

Specific

External links
Monthly Weather Review for 1909

Category 3 Atlantic hurricanes
1909 Atlantic hurricane season
Hurricanes in Texas
Hurricanes in the Leeward Islands
Hurricanes in Cuba
Hurricanes in the Dominican Republic
Hurricanes in Haiti
Atlantic hurricanes in Mexico
1909 natural disasters in the United States
1909 in Mexico